Yasnensky District is an administrative district (raion), one of the thirty-five in Orenburg Oblast, Russia. It is located in the southeast of the oblast. Its administrative center is the town of Yasny (which is not administratively a part of the district). Population: 5,043 (2010 Census);

Administrative and municipal status
Within the framework of administrative divisions, Yasnensky District is one of the thirty-five in the oblast. The town of Yasny serves as its administrative center, despite being incorporated separately as an administrative unit with the status equal to that of the districts.

As a municipal division, the territory of the district and the territory of the Town of Yasny are incorporated together as Yasnensky Urban Okrug. Prior to May 1, 2015, the district was incorporated as Yasnensky Municipal District, with the Town of Yasny being incorporated within it as Yasny Urban Settlement.

References

Notes

Sources



Districts of Orenburg Oblast